Edward Baird may refer to:
Edward Baird (artist) (1904–1949), Scottish artist
Edward Baird (rugby) (1885–1917), Australian rugby league footballer
Edward Kellogg Baird (1876–1951), American attorney and the president of the Century Opera Company

See also
Ed Baird (born 1958), American sailor